Metazaleptus is a genus of harvestmen in the family Sclerosomatidae from South and Southeast Asia.

Species
 Metazaleptus adspersus (Roewer, 1955)
 Metazaleptus borneensis Banks, 1930
 Metazaleptus guttatus (Roewer, 1955)
 Metazaleptus hirsutus (With, 1903)
 Metazaleptus luteomaculatus (Suzuki, 1977)
 Metazaleptus montanus Banks, 1930
 Metazaleptus palpalis Banks, 1930
 Metazaleptus rufescens Banks, 1930

References

Harvestmen
Harvestman genera